Minuscule 763 (in the Gregory-Aland numbering), ε539 (von Soden), is a Greek minuscule manuscript of the New Testament written on parchment. Palaeographically it has been assigned to the 14th century. The manuscript has complex contents. Scrivener labelled it as 854e.

Description 
The codex contains the text of the four Gospels, on 324 parchment leaves (size ). The text is written in one column per page, 21 lines per page. The texts of Matthew 1:1-13:46; Luke 2:37-5:1 were supplied by a later hand on paper.

Lectionary books with hagiographies Synaxarion and Menologion were added by a 15th-century hand.

Text 
The Greek text of the codex is a representative of the Byzantine text-type. Hermann von Soden classified it to the textual family Kr. Aland placed it in Category V.

According to the Claremont Profile Method it represents textual family Kr in Luke 1 and Luke 20. In Luke 10 no profile was made. It creates textual cluster 763.

The text of the Pericope Adutlerae (John 7:53-8:11) is marked by an obelus.

History 
Scrivener dated the manuscript to the 15th century; Gregory dated the manuscript to the 14th century. The manuscript is currently dated by the INTF to the 14th century.

In 1843 the manuscript was brought from the monastery of St. George in Locris to Athens, along with 762.

It was added to the list of New Testament manuscripts by Scrivener (854) and Gregory (763). Gregory saw the manuscript in 1886.

The manuscript is now housed at the National Library of Greece (156) in Athens.

See also 

 List of New Testament minuscules
 Biblical manuscript
 Textual criticism
 Minuscule 762

References

Further reading 

 

Greek New Testament minuscules
14th-century biblical manuscripts
Manuscripts of the National Library of Greece